Fayaz, also known as Koli Fayaz and Murgi Fayaz, was one of the underworld dons of Bangalore in the 1980s and 1990s. He was called 'Koli' Fayaz because he ran a poultry farm.

He was killed in 1995 by a gang attack led by Rizwan, Sultan, chappal Hameed, Tanveer his closest associate later took power over Shivajinagar for over a decade.

References

Indian gangsters
1995 deaths
1995 murders in India
Indian robbers
Murdered criminals
Outlaws
People from Bangalore Urban district
Year of birth missing
People murdered in Karnataka